Events from the year 1638 in Sweden

Incumbents
 Monarch – Christina

Events

 March 5 – Thirty Years' War – The Treaty of Hamburg is signed by France and Sweden.
 March 29 – Settlers from Sweden arrive on the ships Kalmar Nyckel and Fogel Grip to establish the settlement of New Sweden in Delaware, beginning the Swedish colonization of the Americas.
 Posti Group is founded.

Births

 
 
 
 
 
 21 January – Beata Rosenhane, feminist poet (died 1674)
 Lucidor, poet (died 1674)
 Margareta Brahe, courtier (born 1559)

Deaths

 13 December – Catherine of Sweden, Countess Palatine of Kleeburg, princess (born 1584)

References

 
Years of the 17th century in Sweden
Sweden